This is a list of lakes in Puerto Rico.

Puerto Rico is an archipelago composed by an eponymous main island, the isle municipalities of Vieques and Culebra, as well as several cays.

See also 

List of dams and reservoirs in Puerto Rico
List of swamps of Puerto Rico

References

External links
Puerto Rico Guide from Satellite

Puerto Rico
Lakes
Puerto Rico